Ferdinand Berthier (September 30, 1803 in Louhans, Saône-et-Loire, France - July 12, 1886 in Paris) was a deaf educator, intellectual and political organiser in nineteenth-century France, and is one of the earliest champions of deaf identity and culture.

Biography
Berthier first attended the famous school for the Deaf in Paris as a young student in 1811, when the school was under the directorship of Abbé Roch-Ambroise Sicard. He came from the rural south-east of France to learn basic vocational skills and literacy to prepare him for work as a tradesman. He was influenced by his teacher Roch-Ambroise Auguste Bébian, a hearing man who had learned French Sign Language and published the first systematic study and defense of the language. Berthier was also struck by two important deaf students of the school who later became teachers: Jean Massieu and Laurent Clerc. By the age of 27 Berthier had become one of the more senior professors at the school.

In late 1837 Berthier petitioned the French government for permission to create the Société Centrale des Sourds-muets, which was officially founded the following year as the first organisation to represent the interests of the deaf community. The organisation aimed to bring together "all the deaf spread across the globe... to put speaking and deaf men of intelligence and heart in rapport with each other, no matter the distance, no matter the difference in language, culture and laws," and offered deaf workers a practical avenue to support each other through "mutual aid" and a way to organize and attend adult education classes. Berthier played a delicate balancing act as a passionate defender of the deaf identity and sign language, while under a repressive social and political climate.

Berthier wrote books about deaf history and deaf culture, noting deaf artists and sign-language poets of his time.

Awards
 First deaf person to receive the Chevalier de la Légion d'honneur in 1849

See also
 Roch-Ambroise Auguste Bébian

Published works
 "L’Abbé Sicard... précis historique sur sa vie, ses travaux et ses succès..." (Paris: Charles Dounoil, 1873)
 "Histoire et statistique de l’éducation des sourds-muets" (Paris: chez l’auteur, 1836)
 "Notice sur la vie et les ouvrages d’Auguste Bébian" (Paris: J. Ledoyen, 1839)

References

 Moody, W. 1987. "Berthier, Jean-Ferdinand (1803-1886)". In Gallaudet Encyclopedia of Deaf People and Deafness, vol. 1, ed. J. V. Van Cleve, 141–143. New York: McGraw-Hill.
 Quartararo, Anne T. The Life and Times of the French Deaf Leader, Ferdinand Berthier: An Analysis of His Early Career, Sign Language Studies, Vol. 2, No. 2, Winter 2002.

External links
 
 

1803 births
1886 deaths
People from Louhans
Educators of the deaf
French educators